Northwoods Mall is an enclosed shopping mall in Peoria, Illinois. The mall opened in 1973. It is situated at the corner of Scenic Drive and U.S. Route 150 (West War Memorial Drive). The anchor stores are JCPenney, Round 1 Entertainment, and The RoomPlace. There is 1 vacant anchor store that was once Sears.

History
Northwoods Mall opened in 1973 and was designed by architects Sidney H. Morris & Associates of Chicago, with Harold Carson Associates as the manager. The original anchor stores upon opening were Montgomery Ward, Carson Pirie Scott (shortened later to Carson's), and JCPenney. Original tenants included Helzberg Diamonds, B. Dalton, Claire's, GNC, a Fannie May candy shop, a bank, Brown's Sporting Goods, and several restaurants.

The mall was sold to Simon Property Group in 1983. Carson's closed that same year and was replaced two years later by Famous-Barr. Also in 1983, a botulism outbreak at the mall's Skewer Inn restaurant affected 28 customers.

Montgomery Ward closed its store in the mall in 1997, and Sears occupied its space a year later. A 2005 renovation added a food court. The Famous-Barr store was re-branded as Macy's in 2006. On January 7, 2016, it was announced that Macy's would close in March 2016 as part of a plan to close 40 stores nationwide. In 2017, Round 1 Entertainment moved into part of the vacant Macy's store on the 1st floor which opened on November 18, 2017. In 2018, it was announced that The RoomPlace would move into the rest of the half vacant Macy's store on the 2nd floor which opened on May 11, 2018. On May 25, 2018, a Peoria police substation opened at the mall which is located on the upper level close to Sears. On August 24, 2018, it was announced that Hibbett Sports will open on September 15, 2018. The new store will open on the upper level close to Sears. On September 25, 2018, it was announced that a new store Go! Calendars, Games and Toys opened a few days ago. The space was once occupied by Hallmark Cards. On November 1, 2018, it was announced that an indoor Knockerball facility would open. The facility will open on the upper level next to Sears and will be open to the public as well as hosting private events. On November 20, 2018, it was announced that Forever 21 would open in the mall in summer 2020 but it might not ever open because of its bankruptcy. On November 7, 2019, it was announced that Sears would close in February 2020 as part of a plan to close 96 stores nationwide. After Sears closed, JCPenney became the only remaining traditional anchor store left. Sears closed on February 16, 2020. In 2020, Spirit Halloween served as a temporary anchor store in the former Sears.

References

External links

1973 establishments in Illinois
Buildings and structures in Peoria, Illinois
Kohan Retail Investment Group
Shopping malls established in 1973
Shopping malls in Illinois
U.S. Route 150